Eaton is a town in Madison County, New York, United States.  The population was 5,255 at the 2010 census.

The Town of Eaton is in the south-central part of the county. US Route 20 passes across the northern part of the town.

History 
The town was the principal location of the Oneida tribe, a sub-group of the Iroquois that allied itself with the colonial forces during the American Revolution. Euro-American settlement began around 1792. The Town of Eaton was formed in 1807 from the Town of Hamilton. Eaton is named for William Eaton, a Revolutionary officer and commander of the United States military forces in Tripoli.

Geography
Eaton is centered at 42.850 degrees north latitude, 75.612 degrees west longitude. The town contains the geographic center of the state (near Pratts Hollow). The Chenango River flows through the town.

Demographics

As of the census of 2000, there were 4,826 people, 1,358 households, and 935 families residing in the town.  The population density was 107.9 people per square mile (41.6/km2).  There were 1,798 housing units at an average density of 40.2 per square mile (15.5/km2).  The racial makeup of the town was 90.41% White, 6.55% African American, 0.46% Native American, 1.06% Asian, 0.46% from other races, and 1.08% from two or more races. Hispanic or Latino of any race were 1.99% of the population.

There were 1,358 households, out of which 33.2% had children under the age of 18 living with them, 53.3% were married couples living together, 10.4% had a female householder with no husband present, and 31.1% were non-families. 23.3% of all households were made up of individuals, and 9.6% had someone living alone who was 65 years of age or older.  The average household size was 2.58 and the average family size was 3.06.

In the town, the population was spread out, with 20.0% under the age of 18, 30.7% from 18 to 24, 20.8% from 25 to 44, 17.0% from 45 to 64, and 11.6% who were 65 years of age or older.  The median age was 24 years. For every 100 females, there were 103.6 males.  For every 100 females age 18 and over, there were 99.0 males.

The median income for a household in the town was $36,229, and the median income for a family was $39,643. Males had a median income of $30,417 versus $23,107 for females. The per capita income for the town was $14,538.  About 6.0% of families and 9.5% of the population were below the poverty line, including 12.6% of those under age 18 and 2.1% of those age 65 or over.

Communities and other locations in Eaton 
Davis Corners – A location by the northern town line.
Eagleville – A hamlet south of Morrisville.
Eaton – The hamlet of Eaton in the southern part of the town on Route 26, south of Morrisville.
Eaton Reservoir – A reservoir partly in the southwest part of the town.
Eaton Station – A location northeast of Eaton village.
Gills Corners – A location in the northeastern corner of the town.
Leland Pond – Two ponds separated by a short channel located south of the hamlet of Pine Woods.
Morrisville – Village of Morrisville is the location of the Morrisville State College, the Morrisville Equine Center, and the Morrisville Fish Hatchery.  Morrisville is in the northwestern part of the town.
Morrisville Station – A  hamlet east of Morrisville on Route 20.
Pecksport – A location by the eastern town line.
Pierceville – A hamlet between Eaton village and West Eaton on Route 26.
Pine Woods – A hamlet, associated with the Oneida, located on Route 20.
Pratts – A hamlet in the northeastern part of the town.
Pratts Hollow – The Geographic Center of New York is in the northeastern part of the town.
West Eaton – A hamlet in the southwestern part of the town.
White Corners – A hamlet in the northeastern part of the town.
Williams Corners – A hamlet west of Morrisville.

References

External links
  Early Eaton history
  A Pratts Hollow brief history

Syracuse metropolitan area
1807 establishments in New York (state)
Populated places established in 1807
Towns in Madison County, New York